Cecil Joseph Herbert Pearson (22 January 1888 – 14 September 1971) was an English cricketer.  A bespectacled cricketer, Pearson was a right-handed batsman who bowled right-arm off break.  He was born in Poplar, London.

Pearson made his only first-class appearance for Glamorgan in the 1922 County Championship against Nottinghamshire.  He bowled 4 overs in Nottinghamshire's first-innings, though he didn't take any wickets.  In Glamorgan's first-innings, he scored 9 runs before being dismissed by Len Richmond.  In their second-innings, he was dismissed for a duck by Fred Barratt, becoming one of Barratt's 8 victims in that innings, as a Glamorgan side in its second season of first-class cricket capitulated to 47 all out, to lose by an innings and 125 runs.

He died in Porthcawl, Glamorgan on 14 September 1971.

References

External links
Cecil Pearson at ESPNcricinfo
Cecil Pearson at CricketArchive

1888 births
1971 deaths
People from Poplar, London
Cricketers from Greater London
English cricketers
Glamorgan cricketers